Siberian State Transport University is a state university located in Novosibirsk, Russia. It was founded in 1932.

Universities in Novosibirsk Oblast
Universities and institutes established in the Soviet Union
Educational institutions established in 1932
Education in Novosibirsk
Zayeltsovsky City District, Novosibirsk
1932 establishments in Russia
Engineering universities and colleges in Russia